Motilon may refer to:

 Motilón people, an ethnic group of Colombia
 Motilón language
 Motilon (beetle), a genus of insects in the subfamily Prioninae
 Hieronyma macrocarpa, also known as motilón in Spanish, a species of tree